Guangzhou Automobile Industry Group Co Ltd (GAIG) is a Chinese state-owned joint stock holding company that owns several Chinese automakers.

A Chinese partner of Japanese companies Toyota and Honda, GAIG owns Chinese production bases that produce Chinese-market versions of the Japanese carmakers' models, which sell well in Southern China as of 2010.

History
Born during a reconstruction of the Guangzhou automotive industry in 2000, GAIG receives considerable support from the governments of Guangdong province and Guangzhou city.

Formerly the Guangzhou Automobile Industry Group Company, it was renamed in 2003.

In 2007, GAIG began putting in motion plans to sell automobiles under its own brand and to further this goal had acquired a controlling share in an R&D center at South China University of Technology.

By 2010, it was selling its own vehicles under the GAC Trumpchi brand.

Holdings
The company has ownership in a number of Chinese automakers.

Guangzhou Automobile Group Co Ltd

Guangzhou Automobile Group Co Ltd was founded in 1997, and by 2005 it had become a holding of GAIG. As of 2009, it is the 6th largest automaker in China.

References

External links
GAIG Official Site
GAC Official Site
Guangqi Honda (Chinese)
Guangzhou Toyota Motor (Chinese)

Companies formerly in the Hang Seng China Enterprises Index
Manufacturing companies based in Guangzhou
Chinese companies established in 2000
Vehicle manufacturing companies established in 2000
Government-owned companies of China
Car manufacturers of China